National Secondary Route 248, or just Route 248 (or ) is a National Road Route of Costa Rica, located in the Limón province.

Description
In Limón province the route covers Pococí canton (Roxana district), Guácimo canton (Guácimo, Río Jiménez, Duacarí districts).

References

Highways in Costa Rica